Nikita Matthew Hopkins (born 13 August 1991) is an American screenwriter, visual artist, and former child voice actor and singer who had a career for seven years as the singing and speaking voice of young Roo in six movies and videos of Winnie the Pooh. Hopkins is one of the rare voice actors in entertainment media to begin as a child.

Career
He began his career at The Walt Disney Company. His first role was the voice of Roo for 'Winnie the Pooh: Seasons of Giving, and he continued his voice work as Roo in The Tigger Movie, Mickey's Magical Christmas: Snowed in at the House of Mouse, Piglet's Big Movie, and Pooh's Heffalump Movie, as well as in the television and video puppet series The Book of Pooh (2001–2003). He can also be heard as an additional voice for Lilo & Stitch: The Series, House of Mouse, Zeta Project, 101 Dalmatians II: Patch's London Adventure, and more.

Retirement and future
In 2006, Hopkins resigned from voice work and went on to study and work on motion pictures and television at the Academy of Art University in San Francisco, California.

Selected filmography
Winnie the Pooh: Seasons of Giving (1999) (voice) "Roo"
The Tigger Movie (2000) (voice) "Roo", Nominated – Annie Award for Male Voice Acting in a Feature Production
Clerks: The Animated Series (2000) (voice) "Kid/Campfire Kid"
The Book of Pooh (2001–2003) (voice) "Roo"
House of Mouse (2001) (voice) "Chip"
The Zeta Project (2001) (voice) "Kid Rudy"
Mickey's Magical Christmas: Snowed in at the House of Mouse (2001) (voice) "Roo"
101 Dalmatians II: Patch's London Adventure (2003) (voice) "Hoesome Tommy"
Piglet's Big Movie (2003) (voice) "Roo"
Pooh's Heffalump Movie (2005) (voice) "Roo" (Final film role)

Video games
"My Interactive Pooh" (1998) (voice) "Roo"
"Winnie the Pooh: Toddler" (1999) (voice) "Roo"
"Disney's Beauty and the Beast: Magical Ballroom" (2000) (voice) "Chip"
"The Emperor's New Groove" (2000) (voice)
"Tigger's Honey Hunt" (2000) (voice) "Roo"
"Disney's Activity Center: Winnie the Pooh" (2000) (voice) "Roo"
"Winnie the Pooh: Baby" (2001) (voice) "Roo"
"Piglet's Big Game " (2003) (voice) "Roo"

Live-action
Power Rangers Wild Force (2002) "Soccer Player"

External links

References

American male child actors
American male film actors
American male television actors
American male voice actors
Living people
Male actors from Santa Clarita, California
Date of birth missing (living people)
1991 births